Emir Miray Köksal (born 18 October 2001) is a Turkish professional footballer who plays as an left back for Iğdır.

Professional career
On 16 April 2020, signed his first professional contract with Fenerbahçe. Köksal made his professional debut with Fenerbahçe in a 3-1 Süper Lig win over Çaykur Rizespor on 25 July 2020.

References

External links
 
 
 

2001 births
Sportspeople from Adapazarı
Living people
Turkish footballers
Association football fullbacks
Fenerbahçe S.K. footballers
Şanlıurfaspor footballers
Süper Lig players
TFF Second League players
TFF Third League players